Les Jumelles is a mountain in the Chablais Alps, overlooking Taney in Valais. It has two distinct summits, the highest (Grande Jumelle) being 2,215 metres high and the lowest (Petite Jumelle) being 2,182 metres high.

References

Mountains of the Alps
Mountains of Valais
Mountains of Switzerland
Two-thousanders of Switzerland